The Spanish Rhythmic Gymnastics Championship is the most important national rhythmic gymnastics competition in Spain. It is organized annually since 1975 by the Royal Spanish Federation of Gymnastics and today, since 2010, it is called the Spanish Championship of Individuals, Clubs and Autonomies. It is currently held in June and alongside the Spanish Men’s Individual Championship.

History 
The first two editions took place at the same time as the Spanish Group Championship and mid-year, going from 1977 to 1985 they were held independently and in December. The first edition took place at the Moscardó Gymnasium in Madrid at the end of April 1975. Since 1986 it's held mid-year, usually in June. In this first national event was proclaimed champion Begoña Blasco, while María Jesús Alegre and África Blesa shared the second place. María Jesús Alegre would be the champion in the next two editions.

Carolina Rodríguez is the most decorated gymnast in all categories, with 12 titles (1 in newbies, 1 in children, 1 in 1st category and 9 in honour). She is also the gymnast who has been the most times champion of Spain in the general competition of the honour category, with 9 titles.

Categories 
Different categories are used depending on the age of gymnasts when the competition is held. These categories are Benjamin (youngsters) 8 - 9, Alevín (newbie) 10 - 11, Infantil (pre-junior) 12 - 13, Junior 14 - 15 and Senior for those 16 years and over. In addition, in the Spanish Championship is also divided in: 1st category (where gymnasts who had belonged to the team for more than 2 years, winners in the same category the year before, and at least top 3 ranked the year before in junior and senior category compete), the Junior Honor and the Senior Honor (where gymnasts from the national team participate). During the championship, within each of these categories both the All-Around and apparatus finals are scheduled. In addition, there is classification by clubs and autonomies.

List of champions

Most successful gymnasts

References 

Rhythmic gymnastics national championships
Gymnastics competitions in Spain
National championships in Spain